Clarence Edmund Bennett (1833–1902), usually referred to as Clarence E. Bennett, a graduate of West Point, a career  American Army officer who saw duty almost exclusively in Western frontier assignments, served in the American Civil War in California, New Mexico and Arizona Territories and later in Reconstruction occupation forces and frontier duty during the later Indian Wars.

Early life and army service 
Born in New York, Clarence E. Bennett graduated from West Point  and was promoted to Brevet 2nd Lieutenant of Infantry, July 1, 1855.  He served in garrison at Carlisle Barracks, and later on the frontier as a second lieutenant with the U.S. 10th Infantry Regiment from August 16, 1855.  He served at Fort Ripley, Minnesota, from 1855 to 1857.  He was part of the Utah Expedition from 1857 to 1860, serving as regimental adjutant, of 10th Infantry, from October 1, 1858, to July 16, 1860, and served at Fort Laramie, Dakota Territory, in 1860.  He resigned his commission on September 10, 1860, and moved to San Bernardino, California to be a farmer until 1863.  He married Sciota or Siotha Whitlock (born in 1835 in Missouri) in San Bernardino about 1861.  She was the daughter of Harvey Gilman Whitlock and Minerva Abbott, who had been two of the earliest Mormon converts in 1830.  Their four children were: William Clarence, Irvine E., Ida Minerva, and Daisy Whitlock.

Civil War service
During the secession crisis prior to Civil War and following Fort Sumter, Bennett was active in informing Union officials of the activities of the secessionists in San Bernardino County that led to Federal troops occupying Camp San Bernardino within the town and later at Camp Carleton nearby.  He was elected as captain of the local California Militia Company the San Bernardino Mounted Rifles on October 10, 1861, and was commissioned October 26, 1861.  With the Rifles he aided the civil authorities in suppressing Rebellion in the county.  On April 1, 1862, Captain Bennett tendered his resignation from the militia, to Governor Leland Stanford, wishing to be absent from the county for a few months.

Bennett later enlisted in the 1st Regiment California Volunteer Cavalry, in San Francisco on February 9, 1863, serving as a major, stationed first in Southern California commanding at Drum Barracks, with the task of organizing new companies of First California Cavalry Volunteers from February 9 to June 4, 1863.  He was on frontier duty at Camp Morris, in San Bernardino, defending against the threat of secessionists to Union men in the town from June to August, 1863.  From  August 15, 1863, to April 17, 1864, he commanded the garrison at Fort Yuma and was promoted  lieutenant colonel of the 1st California Cavalry Volunteers, December 31, 1863.

From May to December 1864, he commanded Fort Craig, New Mexico Territory then from January to February 1865, Fort Bowie, Arizona Territory.  From February to June 1865, he was given command of District of Arizona, headquartered at Tubac. On March 13, 1865, Bennett was promoted brevet colonel, U. S. Volunteers, For Faithful And Meritorious Services During The Rebellion.  He remained active scouting, making roads, and establishing Camp McDowell, from June 1865, to August 1866.  He was mustered out of the Volunteer Service, on August 15, 1866.

Later army service
From February 23, 1866. Bennett had been returned to service in the regular army re-appointed to the United States Army, with the rank of second lieutenant, 6th Cavalry Regiment and was promoted first lieutenant, 6th Cavalry, July 28, 1866.  He served on quartermaster and commissary duty at Camp McDowell, from December 1866 to March 1867 and was promoted captain, US 17th Infantry Regiment on January 22, 1867.

After a leave of absence from March to December 1867, Captain Bennett joined the regimental garrison at Galveston, Texas on December 8, 1867, remaining there on Reconstruction duty until March 1868.  He served on a court martial at San Antonio, Texas, March 13 to June 26, 1868.  He was then appointed acting assistant inspector-general, District of Texas, from July 1 to August 10, 1868, then for the Fifth Military District, August 10, 1868, to April 10, 1869.  He was on registering duty in the First Military District to June, 1869, then the regiment was sent to Virginia for Reconstruction duty and he was in garrison at Winchester, Virginia, June 1, 1869 to February 1870 and then, due to troubles in the state of North Carolina, his company was sent to Raleigh, North Carolina, February 1870 to April 1870.

Due to increasing trouble with the Sioux, the regiment was ordered to Dakota Territory, and arrived at Fort Sully in mid May, and commenced a long tour of service which lasted over sixteen years.  Captain Bennett served on frontier duty, at Fort Sully, from April 1870, then at Post at Grand River Indian Agency from May 1870 to June 1872.  In June 1872, he traveled to Fort Rice, and participated in the Yellowstone Expedition of 1872 under Colonel David S. Stanley, from July to September 1872. Subsequently, he was in garrisons at Fort Rice, to October 1873, then at Fort Abercrombie, to August 1876, and at Post at Standing Rock Indian Agency, August 1876 to November 1876.  He was a member of the prison board, December 16, 1876, to January 24, 1877, then on a leave of absence, to March 31, 1877.

He returned to frontier duty at Post at Standing Rock Indian Agency from April 25 to December 1877, then was at Fort Snelling, Minnesota, December 1877 to October 10, 1878, and at Fort Sisseton, Dakota, October 16 to December 18, 1878. He was on detached service, December 18, 1878, to February 27, 1879.

Again on frontier duty at Fort Sisseton, Dakota, from February 1879 to May 16, 1884. He was then at Fort Totten, Dakota, from May 1884 to July 13, 1886, (with a leave of absence, January 11 to March 31, 1885).  Finally he served at Fort D. A. Russell, Wyoming, from July, 1886.

Bennett was promoted major, U.S. 19th Infantry Regiment, November 28, 1893.  He was promoted lieutenant colonel, U.S. 11th Infantry Regiment, June 27, 1897. Bennett retired as a lieutenant colonel on December 2, 1897.  He died on November 4, 1902, of apoplexy and was buried at Arlington National Cemetery, in Arlington, Virginia.

References

External links
 
 Clarence E. Bennett Papers (University of Montana Archives)

1833 births
1902 deaths
United States Military Academy alumni
American people of the Indian Wars
People of California in the American Civil War
Burials at Arlington National Cemetery